P572 is a Canadian independent record label founded in 2004 in Quebec City by Sam Murdock and Sébastien Leduc.

To date, the label has released more than a hundred albums, including The Singularity, Phase I of Thisquietarmy (Eric Quach) and Away (Michel Langevin), Songs for Harmonium and Drum Machine by Darren Hayman, UK recording artist, 2 books and many fanzines. In 2015, the label celebrated its eleventh anniversary by releasing a compilation album. By the late 2010s, the label was shifting to releasing more vinyl, which required them to seek international pressing plants to meet their demand.

Artist roster 

(Swedish) Death Polka
Alaclair Ensemble
Arlequin
Arthur Comeau
Black Taboo
Build a Friend
Christian Choquette
Darren Hayman
Docteur Culotte
Don Matsuo
Essertez
Fabien Cloutier
Fourche
Jane Ehrhardt
Les Goules
Headache24
Honey Pine Dresser
HotKid
Hubert Lenoir
Joël Martel et les pépites d’or
Juste Robert
Keith Kouna
Lesbo Vrouven
L'orchestre d'hommes-orchestre
Mathématique
Millimetrik
Oromocto Diamond
Gab Paquet
Princess & Murdock
Quezillacolt45
Rotting Ebitan
Second Hand Virgin
Thisquietarmy X Away
Uberko
VICE & V.I. STREET
Dany Vohl
Zoobombs

See also

 List of Record Labels

References

External links
 P572 Official Website
 P572 on Facebook

Record labels established in 2004
Canadian independent record labels
Indie rock record labels
Companies based in Quebec City